Templecombe Preceptory (or Combe Templariorum) was established in 1185 in Templecombe, Somerset, England.

One of the manors within the parish was held by Earl Leofwine. It was awarded to Bishop Odo of Bayeux after the Norman Conquest. It was his descendant Serlo FitzOdo who granted it to the Knights Templar who established a preceptory in the village in 1185.

The preceptory served as an administrative centre for the lands held by the Templars in the south west of England and Cornwall. It may also have been used to train men and horses for the Crusades.

After the Knights Templar were suppressed following the 1307 order by Pope Clement IV, it was granted to the Knights of St John who held it until the dissolution of the monasteries.

An attempt to discover 'the village of the templars' was made by archaeological television programme Time Team.

References

Monasteries in Somerset
1539 disestablishments in England
Preceptories of the Knights Hospitaller in England
1185 establishments in England
Christian monasteries established in the 12th century